The Language of the Night: Essays on Fantasy and Science Fiction is a collection of essays written by Ursula K. Le Guin and edited by Susan Wood. It was first published in 1979 and published in a revised edition in 1992. The essays discuss various aspects of the science fiction and fantasy genres, as well as Le Guin's own writing process. The 24 essay selections come from a variety of sources, including journals, book introductions, and award-acceptance speeches. The title comes from Le Guin's description of fantasy literature: "We like to think we live in daylight, but half the world is always dark; and fantasy, like poetry, speaks the language of the night."

Well known as a fantasy and science fiction author by 1979, Le Guin's criticism was relatively difficult to find prior to the publication of this collection. The Language of the Night contains "the most important critical statements [Le Guin] has made to date", addressing topics such as Americans' attitudes towards fantasy fiction, the strengths and weaknesses of science fiction, and the qualities of children's literature. She also discusses the background of her major works such as A Wizard of Earthsea and The Left Hand of Darkness. However, some critics noted that the selections in The Language of the Night vary in significance, with "both substantial and slender contributions to science-fiction journals and symposiums."

In the September–October 1989 edition of Games International (Issue #9), Paul Mason called this "a classic book that should be on every fantasy gamer's shelves."

Patrick Curry, in the 2014 A Companion to J. R. R. Tolkien, wrote that Le Guin's reflections in the essays "remain[ed] evergreen", handling contentious issues such as whether fantasy is escapist, the subtlety of the character portraits in The Lord of the Rings, and that work's handling of the nature of evil.

At the 1980 Hugo Awards, the collection was a nominee in the newly created Best Related Non-Fiction Book category.

References

1979 non-fiction books
American essay collections
Works by Ursula K. Le Guin